Korelskoye is a rural locality (a village) in Porozhskoye Rural Settlement of Onezhsky District, Arkhangelsk Oblast, Russia. The population was 4 as of 2010.

Geography 
Korelskoye is located 26 km southeast of Onega (the district's administrative centre) by road. Porog is the nearest rural locality.

References 

Rural localities in Onezhsky District